Jorge Buxadé Villalba (born 26 May 1975 in Barcelona) is a Spanish lawyer and politician who was elected as a Member of the European Parliament in the 2019 European Parliament election in Spain, and has been spokesperson for Vox since February 2020. He is a member of the national-conservative party Vox and previously worked for the People's Party between 2004 and 2014. In 1995, he was an unsuccessful candidate in the Catalan parliamentary election as a member of Falange Española de las JONS, and in 1996 he was number 8 in the Falange Auténtica list for Barcelona for the Spanish general election.

Political views
Buxadé is the president of the Foro Catalán de la Familia, a conservative organization. He regularly writes for his own blog Lo antiguo es lo nuevo.

He is opposed to the independence of his native Catalonia and is a member and cofounder of anti-secessionist organizations like Societat Civil Catalana and Fundación Joan Boscà.

Jorge Buxadé Villalba is a self-confessed admirer of José Antonio Primo de Rivera, the founder of the Spanish Falange. In September 2012, he described José Antonio and Ernesto Giménez Caballero, one of the ideologues of fascism in Spain, as "two superior souls". In the same article, published on his blog, he condemns the 1978 Constitution, adopted after the end of the Franco regime. He has also been directly linked with the far-right blog Dolça Catalunya, that contains anti-Catalanist, ultra-Catholic and discriminatory, mockery articles.

References

Bibliografia

External links
Official website: Lo antiguo es lo nuevo. jorgebuxade.wordpress.com.

1975 births
Living people
MEPs for Spain 2019–2024
Vox (political party) MEPs
Vox (political party) politicians
Falangists
21st-century Spanish lawyers
Lawyers from Barcelona
Far-right politics in Catalonia